is a private university in Kanazawa, Ishikawa, Japan. The school opened initially as a women's college in 1987. It became coeducational in 1995.

External links
 Official website 

Educational institutions established in 1987
Private universities and colleges in Japan
Universities and colleges in Ishikawa Prefecture
Kanazawa
1987 establishments in Japan